Delibes is a surname. Notable people with the surname include:

 Alicia Delibes (born 1950), Spanish politician and teacher
 François Delibes (1873–?), French fencer
 Léo Delibes (1836–1891), French composer
 Miguel Delibes (1920–2010), Spanish novelist, journalist, and newspaper editor